Dinesh Nanavati (born 1948–1949) is an Indian former first-class cricketer who represented Saurashtra. He later worked as a cricket coach.

Life and career
Nanavati played as a wicket-keeper for Saurashtra between 1977/78 and 1983/84 seasons. He appeared in 32 first-class matches, which included a few for West Zone from 1978/79 to 1981/82. He made more than 1500 first-class runs and effected over 50 dismissals.

Nanavati became a cricket coach after his playing career. He worked for many years at the National Cricket Academy (NCA) as West Zone chief coach, wicket-keeping coach and batting coach. Having previously coached the Mumbai under-19 team, he was appointed head coach of Assam in 2004. He had passed the BCCI Level 3 coaching programme earlier the same year. He resigned from his coaching role at the NCA in 2013, citing health reasons. He also conducted coaching camps in North America.

References

External links 
 
 

Living people
Indian cricketers
Saurashtra cricketers
West Zone cricketers
Indian cricket coaches
People from Porbandar
Date of birth missing (living people)
1940s births